The men's team judo event at the 2015 European Games in Baku was held on 28 June at the Heydar Aliyev Arena.

Results

Repechage

References

External links
 
 
 
 

Men's team
EU 2015
2015